Around 1935, Latvian narrow-gauge railways consisted of 536 km (335 miles) of  gauge, 432 km (270 miles) of  gauge, and 48 km (30 miles) of meter gauge.

One public, one museum, and some industrial peat railways survive.

Common carrier 
Track gauges were  gauge unless otherwise specified.
 First Russian Supply Railway Company
 Valka–Rūjiena–Mõisaküla–Pärnu, branch of the Gulbene Line
 Liepāja–Alsunga line, 67 km, opened in 1932, extended to Kuldīga (20 km)
 Liepāja–Rucava line, 52 km,  narrow-gauge military line, converted to  narrow gauge
 Liepāja–Aizpute railway, 48 km.
 Livonian Supply Railway Company
 Gulbene line, Pļaviņas–Gulbene–Alūksne–Ape–Mõniste–Valga, 202 km, opened in 1903, partially closed in stages.
 Pāle–Staicele, 16 km, opened 1927
 Puikule–Aloja, 12 km.
 Riisselja–Ainaži, 76 km, closed 1975.
 Valmiera supply railway company,  gauge, 1912:
 Valmiera–Smiltene, 32 km, closed 1969.
 Valmiera–Ainaži Harbour, 83 km, closed in 1979.

Peat railway 
The peat companies mainly use  gauge, but there also exists  and  gauge railways.
 Peat railway based at Ozoli
 Peat railway based at Seda
 Peat railway based at Misa
 Peat railway based at Puikule
 Peat railway based at Zilaiskalns
 Peat railway based at Strūžāni
 Peat railway based at Līvāni
 Peat railway based at Baloži

Other 
 There is an historic train in Ventspils. The locomotives are former "Brigadelok" steam locomotives. From 1918 until the early 1960s they ran a regular service from Ventspils along the coast to Mazirbe and further down to Talsi and Stende.
 The Riga Pioneer Railway, 2 km long, was in existence from 1956 to 1997.

References